Ramesh Bornare Patil  is a Shiv Sena politician from Aurangabad district, Maharashtra. He is current Member of Legislative Assembly from Vaijapur Vidhan Sabha constituency as a member of Shiv Sena.

Ramesh Bornare Patil won 2019 Vidhan Sabha election from Vaijapur with a record 57,000 Vote Margin.

Positions held
 2017: Elected as Member of Zilla Parishad, Aurangabad
 2019: Elected to Maharashtra Legislative Assembly

References

External links
  Shivsena Home Page 

Living people
Members of the Maharashtra Legislative Assembly
Shiv Sena politicians
1966 births